Phúc Thọ may refer to several places in Vietnam, including:

 Phúc Thọ District, a rural district of Hanoi.
 Phúc Thọ, Phúc Thọ, a township and capital of Phúc Thọ District.
 Phúc Thọ, Lâm Đồng, a rural commune of Lâm Hà District.
 Phúc Thọ, Nghệ An, a rural commune of Nghi Lộc District.